Ptericoptus caudalis is a species of beetle in the family Cerambycidae. It was described by Henry Walter Bates in 1880. It is known from Guatemala, Honduras, and Mexico.

References

Ptericoptus
Beetles described in 1880